Życie Warszawy was a Polish language newspaper published in Warsaw. Despite its name it was a national pro-establishment newspaper, but since 1990 it was an independent publication increasingly focused on local Varsovian issues.

History and profile
Życie Warszawy was founded in 1944 as an initiative of Polish Workers' Party and/or Marian Spychalski. 

During the communist era the paper was a semi-official organ of the Polish government. It was a pro-PRL mouthpiece, right until the end of communism in the country. In the years 1978 and 1988 the paper consisted of 12-16 pages. The number of pages was 20 in 1998.

In 2004 Życie Warszawy had a circulation of 250,000 copies in weekdays and of 460,000 copies in weekends. The paper was published by Gremi Media Group. As of 2004 Zbigniew Jakubiec, a Polish businessman, was the owner of the paper. It was acquired by Presspublica in August 2007 and in December 2011 the newspaper and its website was integrated into Rzeczpospolita as the local press section.

See also
 List of newspapers in Poland

References

External links
 Newspaper website

1944 establishments in Poland
Publications established in 1944
Newspapers published in Warsaw
Polish-language newspapers
Daily newspapers published in Poland
Defunct newspapers published in Poland
2011 disestablishments in Poland
Publications disestablished in 2011